Sir Cedric Drewe  (26 May 1896 – 21 January 1971) was a British Conservative Party politician. He was the son of Julius Drewe, the English businessman, retailer, and entrepreneur.

At the 1924 general election, he was elected to the House of Commons as Member of Parliament (MP) for South Molton in Devon, defeating the long-serving Liberal MP,  George Lambert, who had held the seat since 1891.  Lambert regained the seat at the next contest, the 1929 general election, and went on to represent South Molton until he retired from the Commons at the 1945 general election.

Drewe returned to Parliament two years later, at the 1931 general election, for the Honiton constituency. He held the seat until he retired from Parliament at the 1955 general election.

He never held ministerial office, but was a Conservative whip for many years, and in Winston Churchill's 1951–55 government, he was the government's deputy chief whip, with the formal title of Treasurer of the Household.

Drewe was appointed into the Royal Victorian Order, as a Knight Commander, by Queen Elizabeth II, on 1 June 1953.

References

External links 
 

1896 births
1971 deaths
Conservative Party (UK) MPs for English constituencies
Knights Commander of the Royal Victorian Order
Members of the Parliament of the United Kingdom for Honiton
Ministers in the Churchill caretaker government, 1945
Ministers in the Churchill wartime government, 1940–1945
Ministers in the Eden government, 1955–1957
Ministers in the third Churchill government, 1951–1955
Treasurers of the Household
UK MPs 1924–1929
UK MPs 1931–1935
UK MPs 1935–1945
UK MPs 1945–1950
UK MPs 1950–1951
UK MPs 1951–1955